Enoyl-CoA hydratase 2 (2-enoyl-CoA hydratase 2, AtECH2, ECH2, MaoC, MFE-2, PhaJAc, D-3-hydroxyacyl-CoA hydro-lyase, D-specific 2-trans-enoyl-CoA hydratase) is an enzyme with systematic name (3R)-3-hydroxyacyl-CoA hydro-lyase. This enzyme catalyses the following chemical reaction on D-3-hydroxyacyl-CoA

This enzyme catalyses a hydration step in peroxisomal beta oxidation.

References

External links

EC 4.2.1